Shafiabad (also Romanized as Shafī‘ābād) is a village in Basharyat-e Sharqi Rural District, Basharyat District, Abyek County, Qazvin Province, Iran. At the 2006 census, its population was 16, in 4 families.

References 

Populated places in Abyek County